The SAS Ladies Masters was a women's professional golf tournament on the Ladies European Tour. It was played in Norway between 2002 and 2009, in July or August each year.

The tournament was the first LET event to be held in Norway. Scandinavian Airlines (SAS) became title sponsor in 2006. It was a constituent of the Volvo Cross Country Challenge.

Winners

See also
Ladies Norwegian Open

References

Former Ladies European Tour events
Golf tournaments in Norway
Summer events in Norway